The 2002 CCHA Men's Ice Hockey Tournament was the 31st CCHA Men's Ice Hockey Tournament in conference history. It was played between March 8 and March 17, 2002. First round games were played at campus sites, while all 'super six' games were played at Joe Louis Arena in Detroit, Michigan. By winning the tournament, Michigan won the Mason Cup and received the Central Collegiate Hockey Association's automatic bid to the 2002 NCAA Division I Men's Ice Hockey Tournament.

Format
The tournament featured four rounds of play. In the First Round, the first and twelfth seeds, the second and eleventh seeds, the third and tenth seeds, the fourth and ninth seeds, the fifth and eighth seeds and the sixth and seventh seeds played a best-of-three series. All six victors in the first round advance as the newly minted 'Super Six' and play only single-elimination for the duration of the tournament. The top two ranked winners receive byes into the semifinals while the four other teams play in the quarterfinals to determine the other qualifiers. In the semifinals, the remaining highest and lowest seeds and second highest and second lowest seeds play a single-game, with the winners advancing to the finals. The tournament champion receives an automatic bid to the 2002 NCAA Men's Division I Ice Hockey Tournament.

Conference standings
Note: GP = Games played; W = Wins; L = Losses; T = Ties; PTS = Points; GF = Goals For; GA = Goals Against

Bracket
Teams are reseeded after the first round and quarterfinals

Note: * denotes overtime period(s)

First round

(1) Michigan vs. (12) Lake Superior State

(2) Michigan State vs. (11) Bowling Green

(3) Northern Michigan vs. (10) Miami

(4) Alaska-Fairbanks vs. (9) Ferris State

(5) Nebraska-Omaha vs. (8) Notre Dame

(6) Western Michigan vs. (7) Ohio State

Quarterfinals

(3) Northern Michigan vs. (8) Notre Dame

(4) Alaska-Fairbanks vs. (7) Ohio State

Semifinals

(1) Michigan vs. (7) Ohio State

(2) Michigan State vs. (3) Northern Michigan

Championship

(1) Michigan vs. (2) Michigan State

Tournament awards

All-Tournament Team
F Michael Cammalleri* (Michigan)
F Chris Gobert (Northern Michigan)
F Jed Ortmeyer (Michigan)
D Brad Fast (Michigan State)
D Mike Komisarek (Michigan)
G Josh Blackburn (Michigan)
* Most Valuable Player(s)

References

External links
2001-02 CCHA Season

CCHA Men's Ice Hockey Tournament
Ccha tournament